This Christmas: Winter Is Coming is the first winter extended play and the third overall by South Korean singer Taeyeon. The extended play is marketed as a special Christmas album release. It was released by SM Entertainment on December 12, 2017.

Release and promotion
This Christmas: Winter Is Coming and the music video for "This Christmas" were released on December 12, 2017. To promote the album, Taeyeon held a three-night concert titled "The Magic of Christmas Time" on December 22, 23 and 24, 2017 at Kyunghee University, Seoul.

Composition
The EP consists of eight tracks, of which shows how much variety of genres and the Christmas atmosphere is expressed through Taeyeon's powerful voice. The opening track "The Magic of Christmas Time" is a sweet English pop ballad song reminiscent of a beautiful animation set in a pure white snowy winter. The title track "This Christmas" is an authentic ballad song featuring a magnificent orchestral sound and the delicate and explosive singing ability of 'Taeyeon' and an instrumental version is also included. While "Let It Snow" is a swing genre song that provides bright energy with colorful guitar performances and brass, string sounds, and you can feel the excitement of Christmas. In addition, "Candy Cane" is a retro pop R&B song that creates a year-end festival atmosphere with jingle bells and rich wind instruments creates an even more joyous mood. "Shhhh" takes inspiration from jazz and blues that was written by poet Won Tae-yeon, who draws attention with its sexy, cute and fun lyrics about a girl looking for a gift hidden by Santa Claus. It contains an emotional pop ballad song "Christmas without You", a sentimental pop ballad song that contains a sad feeling of longing for a lover while looking at the happy scenery of Christmas. The closing track of this winter album is "I'm all ears", which Tamar Herman from Billboard described the track as "swaying", "sentimental pop-rock tune" that her vocal offering herself up as a shoulder to lean on. "I'm all ears" was also released as the EP's second and final single a month after the EP was released.

Reception
This Christmas: Winter Is Coming debuted at number 2 on the South Korean Gaon Album Chart, and at number 6 on the Billboard World Albums Chart. "This Christmas" debuted at number 2 on the South Korean Gaon Digital Chart.

Critical reception

This Christmas: Winter Is Coming received generally positive reviews from media outlets. Hong Dam-young from The Korea Herald considered the album's musical styles as "not like Mariah Carey's classic "All I Want for Christmas Is You". Instead of jingle bell sounds and flamboyant upbeat synths, the eight-track album is drenched in the singer’s calm and undeniable vocal prowess, an instrument on its own". While Idology's editor-in-chief Mimyo praised Taeyeon for creating new Christmas songs, "this album creates a 'new song' by taking the microscopic elements of the Western Christmas season song tradition (beyond 'salt shaker', jazz, etc.) in detail and combining them elegantly".

Awards and nominations

Track listing
Credits adapted from Naver

Charts

Weekly

Monthly charts

Year-end charts

Release history

References

SM Entertainment EPs
Korean-language EPs
2017 EPs
Taeyeon EPs
Christmas albums by South Korean artists
2017 Christmas albums
Pop music EPs